Lourdes Montoya (born 2 March 1966) is a Mexican rower. She competed at the 1992 Summer Olympics and the 2000 Summer Olympics.

References

External links
 

1966 births
Living people
Mexican female rowers
Olympic rowers of Mexico
Rowers at the 1992 Summer Olympics
Rowers at the 2000 Summer Olympics
Rowers from Mexico City
Pan American Games medalists in rowing
Pan American Games silver medalists for Mexico
Pan American Games bronze medalists for Mexico
Rowers at the 1987 Pan American Games
Rowers at the 1991 Pan American Games
Rowers at the 1995 Pan American Games